The Risen Star Stakes is a Grade II American Thoroughbred horse race for three-year-old horses at a distance of one and one-eighth miles on the dirt run annually in February, usually during the President's Day weekend at Fair Grounds Race Course in New Orleans, Louisiana.  The event currently offers a purse of $400,000.

History

The event was inaugurated 16 March 1973 as the Louisiana Derby Trial with handicap conditions over a distance of one mile and forty yards with the Indiana bred colt Navajo victorious by one length over Smooth Dancer with Assagai Jr. in third place. The time run by the winner was 1:40 flat. Navajo received free entry into the Louisiana Derby and finished second to Leo's Pisces. Later that year Navajo ran in the Kentucky Derby and finished seventh to Secretariat.

The event as a trial race immediately became a major prep for the Louisiana Derby.

In 1975 the event was increased to  miles and was won by Master Derby. Master Derby followed up winning the Louisiana Derby. Later in his Triple Crown campaign, Master Derby was victorious in the Preakness.

The event was shortened back to its inaugural distance in 1988 of 1 mile and 40 yards. The event that year was won by Risen Star who  went on to win the Preakness and Belmont Stakes and be voted the 1988 Eclipse Award for American Champion Three-Year-Old Male Horse. The following year the track renamed the event in honor of Risen Star to the Risen Star Stakes.

In 1991 the distance of the event was increased to  miles and in 2002 the American Graded Stakes Committee upgraded the race to Grade III. The event was upgraded once more in 2010 to Grade II.

The Risen Star Stakes was run in two divisions in 1989, 1993, 1995 and 2020.

No winner of the Risen Star Stakes has gone on to win the Kentucky Derby. However, two runners who have run in the event have gone on to win the Run for the Roses. War Emblem finished sixth at Fair Grounds before winning at Churchill Downs in 2002. Country House was second in the Risen Star before crossing second in the 2019 Kentucky Derby, only to be promoted after first-place finisher Maximum Security was disqualified by Kentucky stewards for interference. The Risen Star also has produced two winners of the second leg of the American Triple Crown: Master Derby (1975) and War of Will (2019). It has also produced two winners of the Breeders' Cup Classic: Gun Runner and Mucho Macho Man.

The event is part of the Road to the Kentucky Derby.

Records
Speed  record:
 miles – 1:49.03  Epicenter  (2022)
 miles – 1:42.80 Zarbs Magic (1996)
1 mile and 40 yards  – 1:39.80 Heavy Mayonnaise  (1974)

Margins:
 10 lengths – Badge of Silver (2003)

Most wins by a jockey:
 3 - Shane P. Romero  (1988, 1989, 1992)
 3 - Robby Albarado (2003, 2004, 2007)
 3 - Florent Geroux (2016, 2020, 2021)

Most wins by a trainer:
 3 - Neil J. Howard (1992, 1998, 2004)
 3 - Todd A. Pletcher (2010, 2012, 2014)
 3 - D. Wayne Lukas (1997, 2000, 2018)
 3 - Steve Asmussen (2008, 2016, 2022)
 3 - Brad H. Cox (2020, 2021, 2023)

Most wins by an owner:
 3 - William S. Farish III (1992, 1998, 2004)
 3 - Winchell Thoroughbreds (2008, 2016, 2022)

Risen Star Stakes – Louisiana Derby double:
Master Derby †(1975), Taylor's Special †(1984), Risen Star †(1988), Dispersal (1989), Line in the Sand (1992), Dixieland Heat (1993), Comic Strip (1998), Pyro (2008), Friesan Fire (2009), International Star (2015), Gun Runner (2016), Girvin (2017), Epicenter (2022)

Notes:

† Risen Star Stakes was known as the Louisiana Derby Trial.

Winners

Notes:

§ Ran as an entry

See also
List of American and Canadian Graded races

External links
Ten Things You Should Know About the Risen Star Stakes at Hello Race Fans!

References

Fair Grounds Race Course
Flat horse races for three-year-olds
Triple Crown Prep Races
Graded stakes races in the United States
Horse races in New Orleans
Horse racing
Recurring sporting events established in 1973
1973 establishments in Louisiana
Grade 2 stakes races in the United States